Chuck Cooper may refer to:

Chuck Cooper (actor) (born 1954), American actor
Chuck Cooper (basketball) (1926–1984), American basketball player

See also
Charles Cooper (disambiguation)